Horacio Martín Calcaterra (born 22 February 1989) is a footballer who plays as a winger for Universitario de Deportes. Born in Argentina, he plays for the Peru national team.

Club career
Calcaterra began his senior career with Rosario Central in the 2007–08 Argentine Primera División season.

In January 2011, he joined the recently promoted Peruvian club Unión Comercio.
Calcaterra made his debut in the first Round of the 2011 season in a 4–1 loss against Alianza Lima. He scored a goal with an assist by Miguel Trauco. There he played under managers Hernán Lisi and later Julio César Uribe. Calcaterra featured as a regular for Comercio, making 26 appearances with 4 goals during the season.

On 20 January 2012, it was announced that Calcaterra had joined the Universitario de Deportes.

He has played with the Sporting Cristal since 2013, where he disputed with the Copa Libertadores for the first time.

International career
Born in Argentina, Calcaterra was nationalized as a Peruvian. He represents the Peru national team since 2018.

References

External links

1989 births
Living people
Footballers from Santa Fe, Argentina
Peruvian footballers
Peru international footballers
Argentine footballers
Peruvian people of Argentine descent
Sportspeople of Argentine descent
Argentine emigrants to Peru
Argentine expatriate footballers
Rosario Central footballers
Unión Comercio footballers
Club Universitario de Deportes footballers
Sporting Cristal footballers
Peruvian Primera División players
Association football wingers
Naturalized citizens of Peru